Makarovsky is a rural locality (a khutor) in Krasnoyarskoye Rural Settlement, Chernyshkovsky District, Volgograd Oblast, Russia. The population was 112 as of 2010. There are 4 streets.

Geography 
Makarovsky is located 12 km northeast of Chernyshkovsky (the district's administrative centre) by road. Krasnoyarsky is the nearest rural locality.

References 

Rural localities in Chernyshkovsky District